Helena Pasierbska-Wojtowicz (1921 – 12 March 2010) was a Polish writer.

During the Second World War, she joined the Polish resistance organization (first Związek Walki Zbrojnej, later Armia Krajowa) and served as a curier and nurse. Took part in the Operation Ostra Brama. After the war, she became a teacher and also researched the Ponary massacre. She published several books and articles.

In 1975, she was decorated with Armia Krajowa Cross and in 2004, she received the Polonia Mater Nostra Est award. She was also an honorary member of Polish Association in Lithuania (Związek Polaków na Litwie) and a leader of "Ponary Families" Association (Stowarzyszenie „Rodzina Ponarska”).

Works
 various articles, mostly in Nasz Dziennik
Ponary. Wileńska golgota, Sopot, 1993
Wileńskie Łukiszki na tle wydarzeń lat wojny 1939-1944, 2003, self-published, 
Ponary i inne miejsca męczeństwa Polaków z Wileńszczyzny w latach 1941-1944 (Ponary and other places of martyrdom of Poles in Vilnius Region in the years 1941-1944), Łowicz, 2005.
Ponary. Największe miejsce kaźni koło Wilna (1941-1944), Zarząd Ochrony i Konserwacji Zespołów Pałacowo-Ogrodowych, Warszawa, 1993,

References 

  Short biography

1921 births
2010 deaths
Polish women writers
Writers from Vilnius
20th-century Polish writers
Home Army members
Recipients of the Armia Krajowa Cross
20th-century women writers
Polish nurses
20th-century Polish women